Doubs may refer to:

Doubs (river) , a river in France and Switzerland
Doubs (department) , a department of France
Doubs, Doubs , a municipality in this department
Romeo Doubs (born 2000), American football player